Misamis's 1st congressional district was one of the two congressional districts of the Philippines in the formerly undivided province of Misamis. It was created ahead of the 1907 Philippine Assembly elections and initially comprised the municipalities east of Macajalar Bay and on the island of Camiguin, namely Balingasag, Mambajao, Tagoloan and Talisayan. It was represented in all three meetings of the Philippine Assembly from 1907 to 1916 and the first five meetings of the House of Representatives under the Insular Government of the Philippine Islands from 1916 to 1931.

The district was represented by a total of six representatives throughout its existence. It was abolished in 1931 after Misamis was split between the new provinces of Misamis Occidental and Misamis Oriental created through Act No. 3537 in 1930. It was last represented by Silvino Maestrado of the Nacionalista Consolidado who was also designated as the first representative for Misamis Oriental according to the legislative act.

Representation history

See also
Legislative districts of Misamis Occidental
Legislative districts of Misamis Oriental

References

Former congressional districts of the Philippines
Politics of Misamis Occidental
Politics of Misamis Oriental
1907 establishments in the Philippines
1931 disestablishments in the Philippines
Congressional districts of Northern Mindanao
Constituencies established in 1907
Constituencies disestablished in 1929